The 1627 Gargano earthquake struck Gargano and part of Tavoliere, southern Italy, at about mid-day on 30 July 1627. A "very large earthquake" caused a major tsunami, the largest seismic event ever recorded in the Gargano region, which "produced severe damage in the whole promontory", killing about 5,000 people. Four aftershocks were documented. The most extensive damage was noted between San Severo and Lesina.

Some sources describe a large 1626 Naples earthquake, but other have argued that these are misreports of the 1627 event.

References

1627 in Italy
1627 earthquakes
Earthquakes in Italy
1627 tsunamis
Tsunamis in Italy